William Jessop may refer to:

William Jessop (died 1734), English lawyer and Member of Parliament 
William Jessop (1745–1814), English civil engineer notable for work on canals and railways
William E. Jessop, American leader in the Fundamentalist Church of Jesus Christ of Latter-Day Saints
Willie Jessop, American leader of and spokesperson for the Fundamentalist Church of Jesus Christ of Latter-Day Saints
William J. E. Jessop (1902–1980), Irish academic, medical practitioner and politician
Willie Jessop (footballer) (1922–1994), English footballer